Farsi (Qal'a Farsi) is a village and the center of Farsi District in Herat Province, Afghanistan.

See also
Herat Province

External links  
 . Photographs of Farsi.

Populated places in Herat Province